Ježov may refer to places in the Czech Republic:

Ježov (Hodonín District), a municipality and village in the South Moravian Region
Ježov (Pelhřimov District), a municipality and village in the Vysočina Region